Proterochaete is a genus of fungi in the family Auriculariaceae. The type and only species, Proterochaete adusta, produces thin, effused, corticioid basidiocarps (fruit bodies) with a smooth or spiny surface on wood. The species was originally described from North America and is also known from northern Europe and Asia.

Taxonomy
The genus was created as a result of molecular research, based on cladistic analysis of DNA sequences, which showed that Proterochaete adusta, previously referred to the genus Sebacina, formed its own unrelated and distinct clade.

References

External links

Auriculariales
Agaricomycetes genera